Old Wounds may refer to:

"Old Wounds" (The Inside episode), an episode of The Inside
"Old Wounds" (The New Batman Adventures), a 1998 episode of the animated series The New Batman Adventures
Old Wounds (album), a 2008 album by Young Widows
 The premiere episode of The Orville